Forresters Beach is a coastal suburb of the Central Coast region of New South Wales, Australia between Terrigal and Bateau Bay. It forms part of the  local government area. Forresters Beach's reef breaks are well known to surfers. Its name comes from Robert Forrester who purchased  of land in 1861.

Population 
In the 2016 Census 2,900 people resided in Forresters Beach.  82.5% of people were born in Australia. The next most common country of birth was England at 4.8%. 92.1% of people spoke only English at home. The most common responses for religion were No Religion 30.8%, Catholic 25.0% and Anglican 20.7%.

Retirement Village 
 
The Glen Group sought to purchase land in 2004 to build a large Retirement Village at Forresters Beach. Local residents, who felt that the new village would increase population density and the "isolation" of the area would become endangered, opposed the sale.(https://apps.planningportal.nsw.gov.au/prweb/PRRestService/DocMgmt/v1/PublicDocuments/DATA-WORKATTACH-FILE%20PEC-DPE-EP-WORK%20PPS-2017HCC033!20190615T000232.876%20GMT) 
Local residents went to the local council in an attempt to block the development; however, the attempt failed and the village was built. In 2006 the village became open for retirees to move in.

The Village took the place of Forresters Beach Fun Park which throughout the years had been home to Forresters Beach Bowling Alley, Waterslides, Maze, Bungey Jumping, Go-Karts and home of the Forresters Beach Markets, which were popular in the 1990s. The Putt Putt and Swingers 9 Hole golf course no longer remain in the area.

Wyrrabalong National Park
 
The park covers 597 ha but is divided into two separate areas. Wyrrabalong, meaning 'headland looking over the sea' is a word of the Darkinjung people who once occupied the narrow strip of coastline between Forresters Beach and Bateau Bay, which now constitutes the southern section of the park (140 ha). The southern section is characterised by high, exposed coastal cliffs of sandstone and shale and extensive rock platforms at either end that are ideal for fishing and exploring at low tide. There are woodlands of blackbutt, spotted gum and bloodwood along the plateau, with shrubs and heath (mostly coastal banksia and she-oak) on the gentler slopes to the west. Marine and bird life are abundant in the area. Fauna includes goannas, bandicoots, fantails and the tawny frogmouth. 
Wyrrabalong Lookout is located on Cromarty Hill. There is a car park and an adjacent concrete platform with views to the south and west.  This site is also the major TV tower translator for the Wyong area, broadcasting as far as Yarramalong.
A short path leads to Wyrrabalong Lookout on the cliff's edge, 132 m above sea-level, from where there are views south to The Skillion. 
A 1.6 km walking track leads along the cliffs through the attractive woodland to the other viewing platform, Crackneck Lookout (95 m high) where there is a large clearing and car park with information boards and a picnic-barbecue area.

References

Suburbs of the Central Coast (New South Wales)